Oskar von Hardegg was a Württemberger officer who was notable for being the commanding Württemberger figure at the Battle of Werbach during the Austro-Prussian War.

Biography
Hardegg was the fifth son of the chief medical officer and personal physician Johann Georg von Hardegg in Ludwigsburg. His brother was the military writer .

In April 1834 he left the educational institution as a lieutenant and joined the 7th Infantry Regiment of the Württemberg Army in Stuttgart. After some time he was transferred to the Pioneer Corps, in which he was promoted to Oberleutnant in 1842. He then joined the General Staff and in 1847 advanced to the rank of captain . When Generalleutnant  took over the War Office on 2 July 1850; he made Hardegg his adjutant. In the course of his work in the Ministry of War, Hardegg was promoted to Major in 1850, Lieutenant colonel in 1852 and promoted to colonel in 1856. In order to be able to gain practical experience again, Hardegg now asked to be transferred to a line infantry regiment and was appointed commander of the 4th Infantry Regiment. He served the regiment from 22 September 1856 to 27 April 1857. He was then promoted to major general, Hardegg became brigade commander and lieutenant governor of Ulm. In 1865 he was promoted to lieutenant general, division commander and governor of Stuttgart. After the resignation of Minister of War  on 5 May 1866, he took over the management of the Ministry of War.

At the outbreak of the Austro-Prussian War in 1866, as commander of the field division, he led the troops into the Battle of Tauberbischofsheim. During the war, he had a dispute with his Bavarian counterpart, Siegmund von Pranckh over whether to use the new Prussian system or the Swiss Guard System. Knowing the danger the lack of centralization the Southern German States, in October 1866, Hardegg sent a memorandum to Baden, Württemberg, Hesse-Darmstadt, and Bavaria to work on standardizing the equipment, organization, and training of their armies. After the end of the war, he returned to the War Ministry in Stuttgart and retired in April 1867 when the Luxembourg question occurred.

In addition to his professional and specialist knowledge, Hardegg cultivated music with a special passion, both as a pianist and as a composer. One of his most popular compositions was the song Schwarzes Band.

Family
Oskar von Hardegg married Ottilie Kausler, the daughter of Colonel von Kausler. The marriage produced two children. The daughter married the Bavarian Colonel Freiherr von Freyberg-Eisenberg in Dillingen, Hardegg's son became a captain and commander of the 8th Württemberg Infantry Regiment No. 126.

Awards
Order of the Crown, 1851
Friedrich Order, 1864
Military Merit Order, 18 August 1866 (Knight's Cross)

References

Bibliography
 Hermann Niethammer: Das Offizierskorps des Infanterie-Regiments „Kaiser Friedrich, König von Preußen“ (7. Württ.) Vol. 125. 1809–1909. Stuttgart 1909. p. 119.
 Staatsanzeiger für Württemberg. N. 208 Vol. 8. September 1877. p. 1425.
 Schwäbische Chronik.'' N. 203 Vol. 23, August 1877. p. 1813.

1815 births
1877 deaths
People of the Austro-Prussian War
Major generals of Württemberg
People from Ludwigsburg
Military personnel from Baden-Württemberg